Ahmet Daca (died 1945), known also as Ahmet Aga was a Yugoslav Albanian political figure of Sandžak region during World War II.

He originates in region of Rugova, but he lived in Novi Pazar. He was the brother-in-law of  Aćif Hadžiahmetović (Blyta), the main political figure of Sandžak during those times. With the involvement of Hadžiahmetović in the Second League of Prizren, Daca took over as president of the Novi Pazar municipality and district mayor, operating under the Territory of the Military Commander in Serbia.
He created kangaroo court to maintain order in Novi Pazar. In 1944. he met with Chetniks, as a representative of Albanian collaborationist forces, to agree cooperation with them against Yugoslav partisans.  By the end of World War II, with the Yugoslav partisans liberating the region, he was arrested among many Muslim and Albanian collaborationist leaders and militiamen. Daca was executed publicly together with Hadžiahmetović on 21 January 1945, in Hadžet near Novi Pazar. The three sons of his were killed in a mass execution the same day.

He is officially considered a traitor and enemy of the people. Lately, Muslim politicians have made attempts to have him rehabilitated.

References

Sources
 

1945 deaths
Politicians from Novi Pazar
Albanians in Serbia
Albanian collaborators with Nazi Germany
Executed Yugoslav collaborators with Nazi Germany
People killed by Yugoslav Partisans